The Gurjar Apabhraṃśa is one of the many Apabhraṃśas to descend from the Prakrits. It was spoken in the western part of India, throughout the Chaulukya dynasty. A formal grammar of this language, Prakrita Vyakarana, was written by Jain monk and scholar Hemachandra in the reign of Chaulukya king Jayasimha Siddharaja of Anhilwara (Patan).

References

Indo-Aryan languages
Medieval languages